Hunter is the third studio album by American metalcore band A Life Once Lost. It was released on June 28, 2005, by Ferret Music. It is the band's most successful album to date, peaking at number 28 on Billboards Top Heatseekers chart. A deluxe edition of the album was released on June 27, 2006, including a bonus DVD.

Track listing

Deluxe edition bonus DVD (music videos)
With Pitiless Blows
Hunter
Vulture
Rehashed
Surreal Atrocities

The Japanese edition (+DVD) also contains a bonus track.

Personnel
Band members
Robert Meadows – lead vocals
Robert Carpenter – guitar, keyboard
Douglas Sabolick – guitar
Nicholas Frasca – bass, Vocals
Justin Graves – drums
Production
Produced by Rob Caggiano and Eddie Wohl (Scrap 60Productions)
Mixed by Paul Orofino
Mastered by U.E. Nastasi, at Sterling Sound, New York, New York
Additional vocal production by Randy Blythe
Author: Leonardo da Vinci
Management by John Daley (ESU Management)
Booking by Nick Storch (Face The Music Touring)
Public relations by Maria Ferrero (Adrenaline PR ASCAP)
Art direction and design by Paul A. Romano (workhardened.com)

References

2005 albums
A Life Once Lost albums
Ferret Music albums